Salivary gland atresia is congenital blockage or absence of the orifice of a major salivary gland duct or part of the duct itself.

It is a very rare condition. The submandibular salivary gland duct is usually involved, having failed to cannulate during embryological development. The condition first becomes apparent in the first few days after birth where a submandibular swelling caused by a retention cyst is noticed.

References

Salivary gland pathology